This is the complete list of Commonwealth Games medallists in judo from 1990 to 2014.

Men's

Extra Lightweight

Half Lightweight

Lightweight

Half Middleweight

Middleweight

Half Heavyweight

Heavyweight

Open

Women's

Extra Lightweight

Half Lightweight

Lightweight

Half Middleweight

Middleweight

Half Heavyweight

Heavyweight

Open

References
Results Database from the Commonwealth Games Federation

Judo
Medalists

Commonw